Margarita Cordova (born February 26, 1939 in Guadalajara, Jalisco, Mexico) is a Mexican dancer and actress.

Career

Stage and dancing 
In 1958, Cordova and her husband Clark Allen opened for a show starring Jean Arnold at the Cabaret Concert Theatre in Los Angeles. Variety described the couple as "Spanish dance exponents who take the trouble to explain what they're doing during their 30-minute stint. Education has not always been at home in a nitery, but it's a pleasure here [...] the team divides its work with the male member flicking the Spanish guitar and singing..."

In 1960, she and Allen had a 30-minute show in New York. Variety wrote: "Although likeable (sic) in their current New York debut at Julius Monk's Downstairs at the Upstairs, they're not particularly outstanding. It could be that Allen's folksong selection lacks a powerhouse item".

In 1962, Cordova and Allen opened and operated El Cid, a flamenco nightclub on Sunset Boulevard in Los Angeles.

Cordova and Allen performed traditional Spanish and Mexican song and dance at other venues in the Los Angeles area, including Sportsmen's Lodge in Studio City and at the Ebell of Los Angeles Theater.

Television 
She has made numerous guest appearances on several television series from the 1960s, including The Twilight Zone episode "A Thing About Machines" and a 1960 episode of Peter Gunn entitled "Cry Love, Cry Murder". She had a contract role on NBC's short-living soap opera Sunset Beach as Carmen Torres from 1997 to 1999, and also played Rosa Andrade on Santa Barbara from 1984 to 1987, and from 1991 to 1993.

Film 
She appeared in One-Eyed Jacks (1961) as a flamenco dancer.

Personal life 
Cordova was married to musician, actor, and artist Clark Allen. They met in Paris. They studied in Granada, Spain for more than a year where they learned the culture of the Spanish Romani and flamenco music. The couple had two children: a daughter named Angela, who became a fine artist, and a son named David, who became a professional musician and photographer. Angela and David were members of the 1970s band Carmen. Cordova and Allen later divorced.

References

External links

Mexican television actresses
Living people
1939 births
Mexican emigrants to the United States
Actresses from Guadalajara, Jalisco